The Écrivains de Marine is a French association bringing together twenty writers with knowledge and practice of the sea. Founded in 2003 by Jean-François Deniau in close partnership with the French Navy, the writers of the Navy in an agreement signed with the Ministry of Defence which undertakes to "collectively serve the navy, promote and preserve the culture and heritage of the sea, and more generally promote the maritime dimension of France".

The members are unanimously co-opted with the approval of the Chief of Staff of the French Navy. Although they have only associative status, which differs from the status of the Navy Painters, Navy writers may embark on ships of the National Navy and are authorized to wear uniform. They are assimilated to the rank of frigate captain.

Its members include Erik Orsenna, Jean Raspail et Isabelle Autissier among others. Since 2007 its president is Didier Decoin.

Current members 
 Didier Decoin, of the académie Goncourt, President
 Patrick Poivre d'Arvor, vice-president
 , Counter admiral, a member of the académie de Marine, general secretary
 Isabelle Autissier
 
 Jean Rolin
 
 Loïc Finaz, Counter admiral 
 Olivier Frébourg
 Titouan Lamazou
 Erik Orsenna, of the Académie française,
 Yann Queffélec
 Jean Raspail
 Jean-Christophe Rufin, of the Académie française,
 Sylvain Tesson
 Daniel Rondeau
 Patrice Franceschi
 Dominique Le Brun
 Emmelene Landon
 Anne Quemere

Former members 
 Jean-François Deniau of the Académie française (1928–2007), president-founder
 Bertrand Poirot-Delpech, of the Académie française (1929–2006)
 Bernard Giraudeau (1947–2010)
 Michel Mohrt, of the Académie française (1914–2011)
 Pierre Schoendoerffer, member of the Institut de France (1928–2012)
 Simon Leys (1935–2014)
 , of the Académie de Marine
 Michel Déon, of the Académie Française (1919–2016)

See also 
Peintre de la Marine

References

External links 
 Site de la Marine nationale
 Les écrivains de Marine, with Didier Decoin
 Les Écrivains de Marine
 Les Écrivains de Marine montent à bord on L'Express (8 July 2011)

French Navy
French writers' organizations
Nautical fiction